The Song Conquest of the Later Shu was a 964–965 war between the Song dynasty and its southwestern neighbor, the Later Shu. Despite natural barriers, the Later Shu defense proved extremely incompetent, and the Later Shu emperor Meng Chang surrendered within 70 days of the Song invasion.

Notes and references

 

960s conflicts
965
Wars involving the Song dynasty
Wars of the Five Dynasties and Ten Kingdoms
Later Shu